Ainata, or sometimes known as Ainata-Al Ariz, is a Lebanese village, 108 km from Beirut, located in Northern Lebanon, between the Bsharri District and the Baalbek District.

References

Aaynata, Localiban

Populated places in Baalbek District